Joy of Cooking is the first studio album by American band Joy of Cooking formed in 1967 in Berkeley, California. The LP album was first released by Capitol Records in 1971 and reissued on CD by Acadia Records on May 5, 2003. The album peaked at 100 on the Billboard 200 in 1971.

Critical reception 

In Christgau's Record Guide: Rock Albums of the Seventies (1981), Robert Christgau wrote of the album:

The album was listed as the 6th best of 1971 in The Village Voices Pazz & Jop critics poll. Christgau, the poll's creator, ranked it first in his ballot, while fellow critic Ellen Willis placed it second, behind The Who's Who's Next.

Track listing

All songs written by Toni Brown unless otherwise noted.

Side one
 "Hush" (Traditional) – 2:50
 "Too Late, But Not Forgotten" – 4:24
 "Down My Dream" – 4:21
 "If Some God (Sometimes You Gotta Go Home)" – 3:47
 "Did You Go Downtown" (Terry Garthwaite) – 7:39
 "Dancing Couple" 0:58

Side two
 "Brownsville/Mockingbird" (Brown, Garthwaite/Furry Lewis) – 5:55
 "Red Wine At Noon" – 3:39
 "Only Time Will Tell Me " – 5:17
 "Children's House" – 6:55

Personnel 
Joy of Cooking

 Toni Brown –  arranger, composer, guitar, steel guitar, kalimba, keyboards, vocals
 David Garthwaite – bass, guitar
 Terry Garthwaite – arranger, clarinet, composer, guitar, 12-string guitar, vocals
 Fritz Kasten – drums, alto saxophone, saxophone
 Ron Wilson – congas, cowbell, harmonica, harp, percussion, tambourine

Additional personnel

 ED Denson – photography
 Jules E. Kliot – photography
 Furry Lewis – composer
 John Palladino – producer
 Phil Sawyer – engineer
 Pete Tytler – artwork
 Ed Ward – liner notes

Charts

References

External links
 Joy of Cooking official website

Further reading 
 

1971 debut albums
Capitol Records albums